The Tirnavia Edea Ice Cup is an international figure skating competition held in Trnava, Slovakia. Medals are awarded in men's and ladies' singles on the senior (beginning in 2019), junior, novice, and lower levels (including basic novice, juvenile, and pre-juvenile). The event formerly included ice dancing.

Senior medalists

Men

Ladies

Junior medalists

Men

Ladies

Pairs

Ice dancing

Advanced novice medalists

Men

Ladies

Ice dancing

References

External links 
 Slovak Figure Skating Association 

International figure skating competitions hosted by Slovakia